UFC Fight Night: Brown vs. Silva (also known as UFC Fight Night 40) was a mixed martial arts event held on May 10, 2014, at the U.S. Bank Arena in Cincinnati, Ohio.

Background
The event was the second time that the organization has held an event in Cincinnati, after UFC 77 back in 2007.

Alexander Yakovlev and Yan Cabral were originally scheduled to face each other in a welterweight bout.  However, on April 9, Yakovlev was moved to The Ultimate Fighter Brazil 3 Finale card as he replaced an injured Mike Pierce against Demian Maia.  Cabral instead faced Zak Cummings at the event.

William Macario was expected to face Neil Magny at the event.  However, Macario was removed from the bout for undisclosed reasons and replaced by returning veteran Tim Means.

Anthony Lapsley initially weighed in at 174 pounds, over the welterweight limit allowance of 171 pounds.  Lapsley was given an additional two hours to lose the weight.  He successfully weighed in at 171 pounds two hours later.

This card featured the second most victories by fighters considered betting underdogs with eight, second only to UFC Fight Night 38 that featured eight underdog wins.

Results

Bonus awards
The following fighters were awarded $50,000 bonuses:
Fight of the Night: Matt Brown vs. Erick Silva
 Performance of the Night: Matt Brown and Johnny Eduardo

Reported payout
The following is the reported payout to the fighters as reported to the Ohio Athletic Commission. It does not include sponsor money and also does not include the UFC's traditional "fight night" bonuses.
 Matt Brown: $82,000 (includes $41,000 win bonus) def. Erick Silva: $22,000
 Costas Philippou: $46,000 (includes $23,000 win bonus) def. Lorenz Larkin: $28,000
 Daron Cruickshank: $24,000 (includes $12,000 win bonus) def. Erik Koch: $18,000
 Neil Magny: $20,000 (includes $10,000 win bonus) def. Tim Means: $10,000
 Soa Palelei: $32,000 (includes $16,000 win bonus) def. Ruan Potts: $10,000
 Chris Cariaso: $42,000 (includes $21,000 win bonus) def. Louis Smolka: $10,000
 Ed Herman: $80,000 (includes $40,000 win bonus) def. Rafael Natal: $26,000
 Kyoji Horoguchi: $20,000 (includes $10,000 win bonus) def. Darrel Montague: $8,000
 Zak Cummings: $16,000 (includes $8,000 win bonus) def. Yan Cabral: $10,000
 Johnny Eduardo: $16,000 (includes $8,000 win bonus) def. Eddie Wineland: $21,000
 Nik Lentz: $58,000 (includes $29,000 win bonus) def. Manvel Gamburyan: $25,000
 Justin Salas: $24,000 (includes $12,000 win bonus) def. Ben Wall: $8,000
 Albert Tumenov: $16,000 (includes $8,000 win bonus) def. Anthony Lapsley: $8,000

See also
List of UFC events
2014 in UFC

References

UFC Fight Night
Events in Cincinnati
Mixed martial arts in Ohio
Sports competitions in Cincinnati
2014 in mixed martial arts